Egg Harbor, New Jersey may refer to:

 Egg Harbor Township, New Jersey, US
 Egg Harbor City, New Jersey, US

See also
 Little Egg Harbor Township, New Jersey, US
 Great Egg Harbor Bay, a bay located on the southern New Jersey coast, US